Keswick Ridge (2011 population: 1,526 ) is a Canadian rural community in York County, New Brunswick on Route 616.

The local service district of Keswick Ridge takes its name from the community.

History

First settled by the sons and daughters of the Loyalists from Massachusetts, the community still maintains its Loyalist roots.

It is located on the east bank of the Saint John River 20 kilometres upstream from the city of Fredericton, occupying a ridge between the Keswick River and Mactaquac Headpond. Mixed farming and small local business is the major source of income in the area.

"The Ridge" or "God's Country", as it is referred to by locals, is best known for its bucolic scenery, and apple growing.

Route 616 which runs through Keswick Ridge was voted in a CAA survey as Atlantic Canada 9th Worst Roads for 2017, as well as Top Worst Roads for 2018

Education
Keswick Ridge School features a school (KRS) offering multi-age classrooms from kindergarten to grade 8. The school used to be used as a high school but now the high school students are bused into Fredericton High School. The sports teams are known as Keswick Ridge Raiders.

Notable people

Dec 1, 2014 - It was announced today that Deborah and Delbert Munn were joint winners of Canada's November 28/2014 Lotto Max Draw. Their winnings $25 million, in the split draw were approximately $12.5 Million.

In December 2016, local Keswick Ridge farmer Andrew Lovell was honoured as Canada's Outstanding Young Farmer.

See also
List of communities in New Brunswick

References

External links
 York Rural Community Project

Communities in York County, New Brunswick
Designated places in New Brunswick
Local service districts of York County, New Brunswick